Dwane is a given name and an alternative spelling of Duane, Dwayne, Dewayne, Dwain, Dwaine and similar.

Notable people by that name include:

 Dwane Casey
 Dwane Husbands
 Dwane Lee
 Dwane Morrison
 Dwane Wallace
 Kenneth Dwane Bowersox, American astronaut

See also